William Willets Cocks (July 24, 1861 – May 24, 1932) was an American politician who served three terms as from New York from 1905 to 1911.

Life
Born in Old Westbury, Long Island, he attended private schools and Swarthmore College. He engaged in agricultural pursuits.

He was elected Commissioner of Highways of the Town of North Hempstead in 1894, and was re-elected in 1896 and again in 1898. He was a member of the New York State Senate (2nd D.) in 1901 and 1902; a member of the New York State Assembly (Queens and Nassau Co.) in 1904; and a delegate to the 1908 Republican National Convention.

Cocks was elected as a Republican to the 59th, 60th and 61st United States Congresses, holding office from March 4, 1905, to March 3, 1911.

William Cocks was a member of the board of managers of Swarthmore College and was president of the Friends Academy in Locust Valley. He was vice president of the Roslyn Savings Bank and was a director of the Bank of Westbury and the Bank of Hicksville. Cocks was President of the Village of Old Westbury from its incorporation in 1924 until his death there in 1932; interment was in Friends Cemetery, Westbury.

His son, William Burling "Burley" Cocks (1915–1998) was a U.S. Hall of Fame trainer of Thoroughbred racehorses.

Congressman Frederick Cocks Hicks was a brother to William W. Cocks.

References

1861 births
1932 deaths
Politicians from Nassau County, New York
Republican Party New York (state) state senators
Republican Party members of the New York State Assembly
Swarthmore College alumni
Republican Party members of the United States House of Representatives from New York (state)
People from Old Westbury, New York
Burials in New York (state)